Aukerman Creek is a stream in Preble County, Ohio.

Aukerman Creek bears the name of an early settler.

See also
List of rivers of Ohio

References

Rivers of Preble County, Ohio
Rivers of Ohio